Leonard Williams or Len Williams  may refer to:

 Sir Leonard Williams (politician) (1904–1972), British politician and Governor General of Mauritius
 Leonard Williams (bishop) (1829–1916), Anglican bishop in New Zealand
 Leonard Williams (physician) (1861– 1939), Welsh physician and writer
 Leonard E. H. Williams (1919–2007), former head of the Nationwide Building Society and Spitfire pilot
 Leonard Williams (actor) (1917–1962), British actor
 Len Williams (speedway rider) (1921–2007), English international speedway rider
 Len Williams (Canadian football) (born 1971), Canadian football quarterback
 Leonard Williams (American football) (born 1994), American football defensive lineman for the New York Giants
Len Williams (footballer) (1898–1932), English footballer